Brandur Brynjólfsson  (21 December 1916 – 27 July 1999) was an Icelandic former footballer. He is the earliest captain of the Iceland national team, having led the team in its first International Match in 1946 at Melavöllur.

See also
 List of Iceland international footballers

References

External links
 KSÍ profile
 

Brynjolfsson, Brandur
Brynjolfsson, Brandur
Icelandic footballers
Iceland international footballers
Icelandic male footballers
Knattspyrnufélagið Víkingur players
Brynjolfsson, Brandur